Scott Meacham (born  1963) served as the 17th State Treasurer of Oklahoma from June, 2005 to January, 2011, having been appointed to that post by then-Governor Brad Henry following the resignation of then-State Treasurer Robert Butkin. Meacham was subsequently elected to a full four-year term as state treasurer defeating the Republican nominee, Howard Barnett Jr., in the November 2006 general election. He declined to seek reelection as state treasurer in 2010, and joined the Oklahoma City law firm of Crowe & Dunlevy upon completion of his term as state treasurer. In December, 2012, he was appointed as president and CEO of i2e, an Oklahoma City-based non-profit corporation which provides services to startup companies throughout the state.

Early life and education
A fifth generation Oklahoman, Meacham was born and grew up in Chickasha, Oklahoma. Following graduation from high school, he attended the University of Oklahoma, earning a B.A. in finance, an M.B.A., and a law degree.

Prior to joining the administration of Governor of Oklahoma Brad Henry, Meacham practiced law with the Clinton, Oklahoma-based firm of Meacham and Meacham, specializing in commercial law, probate law, and estate planning. In 1989, he became CEO of First National Bank and Trust in Elk City, Oklahoma, serving in that capacity until 2003.

Henry Administration
In 2003, Governor Brad Henry appointed Meacham to serve concurrently as Oklahoma Secretary of Finance and Revenue and as director of the Oklahoma Office of State Finance. In 2005, following the resignation of Robert Butkin to become Dean of the University of Tulsa College of Law, Governor Henry appointed Meacham as State Treasurer of Oklahoma. Following his appointment as state treasurer, he resigned as state finance director, but retained his post as Secretary of Finance and Revenue. Meacham was elected to his first full four-year term as state treasurer defeating the Republican nominee, Howard Barnett Jr., in the November 2006 general elections. In October 2009, Meacham announced that he would not seek another term as state treasurer or run for any other state-level office in the 2010 election.

Personal life

Meacham, his wife, Susan, and their four children, Trevor, Evan, Kady and Lucas, make their home in Edmond, Oklahoma. They attend Crossings Community Church in Oklahoma City.

External links
 

1963 births
Living people
People from Chickasha, Oklahoma
People from Elk City, Oklahoma
People from Edmond, Oklahoma
University of Oklahoma alumni
State treasurers of Oklahoma
State cabinet secretaries of Oklahoma
Oklahoma Democrats
Oklahoma lawyers